Mojné is a municipality and village in Český Krumlov District in the South Bohemian Region of the Czech Republic. It has about 300 inhabitants.

Administrative parts
Villages of Černice and Záhorkovice are administrative parts of Mojné.

References

Villages in Český Krumlov District